Zemacies is a genus of sea snails, marine gastropod mollusks in the family Borsoniidae

Most species in this genus are extinct. Their age range is  55.8 to 11.608 Ma.

Species
Species within the genus Zemacies include:
 † Zemacies armata Powell, 1942 
 † Zemacies awakinoensis Powell, 1942 
 † Zemacies climacota (Suter, 1917) 
 † Zemacies elatior Finlay, 1926 
 Zemacies excelsa Sysoev & Bouchet, 2001
 † Zemacies hamiltoni (Hutton, 1905) 
 † Zemacies immatura Finlay & Marwick, 1937 
 † Zemacies laciniata (Suter, 1917) 
 † Zemacies lividorupis Laws, 1935 
 † Zemacies marginalis (P. Marshall, 1919) 
 † Zemacies ordinaria (P. Marshall, 1918) 
 † Zemacies prendrevillei Marwick, 1928 
 Zemacies queenslandica (Powell, 1969)
 † Zemacies simulacrum Laws, 1935 
 † Zemacies torticostata (P. Marshall, 1919)

References

 H. Finlay, New Shells from New Zealand Tertiary Beds, pt. 2, Trans. N. Z. Inst., vol. 56, p. 252.
.

External links
   Bouchet P., Kantor Yu.I., Sysoev A. & Puillandre N. (2011) A new operational classification of the Conoidea. Journal of Molluscan Studies 77: 273-308
 R. Tucker-Abbott & W.J. Clench, Indo-Pacific Mollusca vol. 2 # 9-10 (1968)